Pilar Burgués Monserrat (born Escaldes, 1958) is an Andorran short story writer.  She received her diploma in geography and history from the University of Zaragoza. She worked from 1983 until 2012 at the National Library of Andorra. There she worked on the literary review Ex-libris Casa Bauró, and on the bibliography and publication catalogue of the government of Andorra. She published her first stories in the review Portella. Andorra, lletres, arts, and has since seen her work published in a variety of other works, such as l’Església de les Valls and the Annals de l'Institut d'Estudis Andorrans. Between 2011 and 2014 she wrote a series of autobiographical sketches that were published as Flaixos de llum blanca, with illustrations by Berta Oromí.

Works
 Flaixos de llum blanca, in: Portella. Andorra, lletres, arts. Andorra: Col·lectiu Portella, 2012. Núm. 5, p. 30-32
 Flaixos de llum blanca. Andorra: Editorial Andorra, 2015

References

1958 births
Living people
Andorran women writers
Andorran women short story writers
21st-century short story writers
21st-century women writers
People from Escaldes-Engordany
University of Zaragoza alumni